Jackman is a town in Somerset County, Maine, United States. The population was 782 at the 2020 census.

Geography

Climate

This climatic region is typified by large seasonal temperature differences, with only warm (but not hot) summers and cold (sometimes severely cold) winters.  According to the Köppen Climate Classification system, Jackman has a humid continental or "hemiboreal" climate (due its lack of true summer heat), abbreviated "Dfb" (or sometimes "Dbf") on climate maps, as does all of Maine.

Demographics

2010 census
As of the census of 2010, there were 862 people, 383 households, and 228 families living in the town. The racial makeup of the town was 96.4% White, 0.1% African American, 1.0% Native American, 0.6% Asian, 0.1% from other races, and 1.7% from two or more races. Hispanic or Latino of any race were 1.7% of the population.

There were 383 households, of which 23.0% had children under the age of 18 living with them, 51.2% were married couples living together, 6.3% had a female householder with no husband present, 2.1% had a male householder with no wife present, and 40.5% were non-families. 32.1% of all households were made up of individuals, and 12% had someone living alone who was 65 years of age or older. The average household size was 2.19 and the average family size was 2.78.

The median age in the town was 44.8 years. 19.5% of residents were under the age of 18; 5.8% were between the ages of 18 and 24; 25.1% were from 25 to 44; 32.1% were from 45 to 64; and 17.5% were 65 years of age or older. The gender makeup of the town was 49.3% male and 50.7% female.

2000 census
As of the census of 2000, there were 718 people, 310 households, and 190 families living in the town.  The population density was 17.5 people per square mile (6.8/km2).  There were 585 housing units at an average density of 14.3 per square mile (5.5/km2).  The racial makeup of the town was 98.75% White, 0.14% African American, 0.56% Native American, 0.56% from other races. Hispanic or Latino of any race were 1.81% of the population.

There were 310 households, out of which 33.5% had children under the age of 18 living with them, 46.8% were married couples living together, 9.4% had a female householder with no husband present, and 38.4% were non-families. 31.9% of all households were made up of individuals, and 15.5% had someone living alone who was 65 years of age or older.  The average household size was 2.25 and the average family size was 2.84.

In the town, the population was spread out, with 25.8% under the age of 18, 5.3% from 18 to 24, 29.2% from 25 to 44, 25.1% from 45 to 64, and 14.6% who were 65 years of age or older.  The median age was 40 years. For every 100 females, there were 96.2 males.  For every 100 females age 18 and over, there were 92.4 males.

The median income for a household in the town was $29,615, and the median income for a family was $33,182. Males had a median income of $29,135 versus $21,310 for females. The per capita income for the town was $15,763.  About 3.7% of families and 9.5% of the population were below the poverty line, including 16.0% of those under age 18 and 13.2% of those age 65 or over.

Education
Jackman is part of Forest Hills Consolidated School, which teaches grades kindergarten to grade 12.

Jackman belongs to Maine Area School District 12.

Railroad history
Jackman became connected to the international North American rail network upon completion the International of Maine Division of the transcontinental Canadian Pacific Railway in 1889.  Jackman Lumber Company built the Bald Mountain Railroad in 1915 north from Jackman up Heald Stream and across the South Branch Penobscot River into Moose River Plantation.  This logging railroad brought logs to the Jackman sawmill until 1926. Passenger rail service through Jackman ended in 1981, resumed in 1985, and ended once more in 1994.

Jackman Lumber Company locomotives

See also 
Armstrong–Jackman Border Crossing

References

External links

Jackman Maine Chamber of Commerce
Town of Jackman

Towns in Somerset County, Maine
Towns in Maine